Zalaszentgrót is a town in Zala County, Hungary. The settlement incorporates the suburbs Kisszentgrót, Tüskeszentpéter, Csáford, Zalakoppány, Zalaudvarnok and Aranyod.

Twin towns – sister cities

Zalaszentgrót is twinned with:
 Germersheim, Germany

External links 

 Street map 
 
 

Populated places in Zala County
Türje (genus)